The 2011 AMA Pro Daytona Sportbike Championship was the third running of the AMA Daytona Sportbike Championship.  The series covered 8 rounds beginning at Daytona International Speedway with the Daytona 200 on March 12, and concluding at New Jersey Motorsports Park on September 4.  The champion was Danny Eslick riding a Suzuki.

Calendar
The calendar was announced with seven rounds on December 8, 2010.  A round at Barber Motorsports Park was added to the schedule on February 16, 2011.

  = World Superbike Weekend
  = MotoGP weekend

Championship standings

Riders' Championship

Manufacturers' Championship

Entry list

See also
 2011 AMA Pro American Superbike Championship

References

External links
The official website of the AMA Pro Racing Championship

AMA Pro Daytona Sportbike
AMA Pro Daytona Sportbike Championship